GRES-1 may refer to:

 Beryozovskaya GRES, a coal-fired power station near the town of Sharypovo in Krasnoyarsk Krai, Russia.
 Ekibastuz GRES-1, a coal-fired power station in Kazakhstan.
 Surgut-1 Power Station, an oil-fired power station in Surgut, Russia.